Ihor Volodymyrovych Bedzai (20 July 1972 – 7 May 2022) was a Ukrainian naval officer and pilot killed when his plane was shot down by invading Russian forces during the Russian invasion of Ukraine. He was a posthumously awarded the title of Hero of Ukraine as a recipient of the Order of the Gold Star, and the Order of Bohdan Khmelnytsky III class.

Commemoration
On 24 June 2022, in accordance with the Decree of the President of Ukraine, in order to perpetuate the memory of the Hero of Ukraine, Colonel Ihor Bedzai, his courage and heroism, indomitable spirit, revealed during the defense of the independence and territorial integrity of Ukraine, taking into account the exemplary performance of the assigned tasks by the personnel The  of the Naval Forces of the Armed Forces of Ukraine, the brigade was named after the Hero of Ukraine, Colonel Ihor Bedzai, and in the future the brigade became known as the "10th Marine Aviation Brigade named after the Hero of Ukraine, Colonel Ihor Bedzai of the Naval Forces of the Armed Forces of Ukraine".

References

Sources
 Указ Президента 
 Діордієв, В. Останній політ, або Земля та небо полковника Бедзая // АрміяInform. — 2022. — 4 серпня.
 Вони зберегли честь Військово-Морських сил України і вберегли Україну від вторгнення на східних кордонах
 На Sea Breeze-2014 відпрацьовано епізод з протичовнового забезпечення кораблів 

1972 births
2022 deaths
Recipients of the title of Hero of Ukraine
Recipients of the Order of Gold Star (Ukraine)
Recipients of the Order of Bohdan Khmelnytsky, 3rd class
Ukrainian military personnel killed in the 2022 Russian invasion of Ukraine
Aviators killed by being shot down
Military personnel from Mykolaiv